Deng Xiaofei (born 31 May 1983) is a Chinese football goalkeeper, who plays for Chinese Super League side Chongqing Lifan.

Club career

Shandong Luneng
A product of the Shandong Luneng youth team he would graduate to the senior team in 2001 and eventually established himself as the team's first choice goalkeeper in the 2003 league season. When the new manager Ljubiša Tumbaković came in at the beginning of the 2004 league season he would bring in Zong Lei as competition for the first choice goalkeeper position. Deng Xiaofei would see his playing time significantly drop, however during this period he would still aid the club to actually win the Chinese FA Cup and Chinese Super League Cup that season. The following season would see youth team player Yang Cheng immediately promoted as first choice goalkeeper, Deng Xiaofei lost favor within the team and was relegated to third choice goalkeeper. When Chinese international goalkeeper Li Leilei came into the team in 2006 Deng Xiaofei was allowed to leave the club.

Wuhan Guangu
He would transfer to top tier club Wuhan Guanggu in the beginning of the 2007 league season and would immediately establish himself as their first choice goalkeeper where he only missed one league match throughout the entire league season. The following campaign he would continue to be a consistent regular within the team despite the club's difficult start to the season saw them in the relegation zone, however the team decided to controversially disband during the season after having a dispute with the Chinese Football Association over the club's punishment against Beijing Guoan on 27 September 2008 where a scuffle broke out during that league game. Without a club, Deng Xiaofei would have to wait before the 2009 league season before he could join another team, however he soon found a buyer in the newly promoted top tier club Jiangsu Sainty at the start of the 2009 Chinese Super League.

Jiangsu Sainty
Deng Xiaofei would make his competitive debut for Jiangsu Sainty in the club's first game of the season on 22 March 2009 against Shanghai Shenhua, which Jiangsu Sainty lost 2–1. Throughout the season he would constantly fight for the first team goalkeeping position against existing goalkeeper Guan Zhen as the team finished in a respectable tenth within the league. The fight for the goalkeeping spot continued until the 2011 Chinese Super League season saw Guan Zhen start as the club's first choice goalkeeper until a difficult start to the campaign saw the club in the relegation zone, this saw Dragan Okuka introduced as the team's new manager and he installed Deng Xiaofei as the first choice goalkeeper while the club finished in their best ever spot of fourth within the league.

On 28 April 2012, Deng set a new Super League record for consecutive clean sheets with 643 minutes, beating the previous record of 620 minutes set by Yang Zhi of Beijing Guoan in the 2011 season. He appeared in every minute of the 2012 league season, playing in all 30 Super League games for Jiangsu Sainty as the club achieved runners-up in the league and gained the entry into their first AFC Champions League. Deng was awarded the Goalkeeper of The Year award from CFA in November. However, Deng's position became unstable after the 2013 season. He lost his position to Zhang Sipeng in the 2015 season.

Chongqing Lifan
On 2 January 2016, Deng transferred to fellow Chinese Super League side Chongqing Lifan after Gu Chao joined Jiangsu Suning in a domestic record transfer for a goalkeeper. He made his debut on 6 March 2016 in a 2–1 home win against Guangzhou Evergrande. He played every minute of the league for Chongqing in the 2016 season.

Deng was loaned to China League One side Zhejiang Greentown for the 2019 season.

Career statistics

Statistics accurate as of match played 10 November 2020.

Honours

Club
Shandong Luneng
Chinese FA Cup: 2004, 2006
Chinese Super League: 2006

Jiangsu Sainty
Chinese FA Cup: 2015
Chinese FA Super Cup: 2013

Individual
Chinese Super League Team of the Year: 2012
Chinese Football Association Goalkeeper of the Year: 2012

References

External links
 
Player stats at Sohu.com

1983 births
Living people
Association football goalkeepers
Chinese footballers
Footballers from Qingdao
Shandong Taishan F.C. players
Wuhan Guanggu players
Jiangsu F.C. players
Chongqing Liangjiang Athletic F.C. players
Zhejiang Professional F.C. players
Chinese Super League players
China League One players